The 1978–79 Ranji Trophy was the 45th season of the Ranji Trophy. Delhi won their first title defeating Karnataka.

Group stage

North Zone

West Zone

South Zone

Central Zone

East Zone

Knockout stage

Final

Scorecards and averages
Cricketarchive

References

External links

1979 in Indian cricket
Domestic cricket competitions in 1978–79
Ranji Trophy seasons